Historical Edifice of Rakhtshooy Khaneh which translates to wash-house, lies at the historical texture of the Zanjan city and it was built nearly 20th century. This place was used for washing clothes by women around the city. It was constructed by two brothers named Mashad Akbar and Mashadi Esmail, Akbar was an architect and Esmail was a stone mason. This historic building is currently being used as Zanjan Anthropological Museum.

References

Buildings and structures in Zanjan Province